Bùi Thanh Sơn (born 16 October 1962) is a Vietnamese politician who is currently the Minister of Foreign Affairs of the Socialist Republic of Vietnam since 2021.

Early life and education
Bùi was born on 1962 in Hanoi. He graduated from Ngo Quyen High School in Haiphong. Afterwards, he attended and graduated in 1984 from the Diplomatic Academy of Vietnam. In 1993, he graduated with masters in International Relations from Columbia University.

Diplomatic and political career

He joined the Communist Party of Vietnam in 1986 and from September 1987, he started working at the Ministry of Foreign Affairs as a research officer at the Institute of International Relations of Ministry of Foreign Affairs. After that, he was respectively appointed to the positions of Deputy Head, then Head of the Europe - America Department at the Office of Academy of International Relations of the Ministry of Foreign Affairs.

From March 1996 to January 2000, he served as the deputy director of the Institute of International Relations and from March 2000 to July 2003, he worked at the Embassy of Vietnam in Singapore as counselor at the mission. Bui served as deputy director and then Director of Foreign Policy Department at the Ministry of Foreign Affairs from September 2008 to August 2009.

Bui served as the assistant to the Minister of Foreign Affairs and director of the Foreign Policy Department from September 2008 to November 2009. He also concurrently served as the head of the negotiating team for the Comprehensive Partnership and Cooperation Agreement between Vietnam and the European Union until June 2012.

In November 2009, he was appointed Deputy Minister of Foreign Affairs by Prime Minister Nguyen Tan Dung and from November 2010, he concurrently served as a member of the National Committee on Youth in Vietnam. From September 2011 to 2015, he concurrently served as a member of the Central Theoretical Council.

Bui was re-appointed as Deputy Minister of Foreign Affairs in February 2015 and from March 2015, he was assigned to be a member and Secretary General of the Inter-sectoral Steering Committee for International Integration in Politics, Security and Defense. In January 2016 at the 12th National Congress of the Communist Party of Vietnam, he was elected to the 12th Central Committee of the Communist Party of Vietnam.

In May 2016, he was first introduced by the central government to be a candidate for the 14th National Assembly. He was a member of the 12th Central Committee of the Communist Party of Vietnam, the executive committee of the Communist Party of Vietnam, Executive of the Party Committee of Central Agencies, Member of the Party Personnel Committee of the Ministry of Foreign Affairs, Secretary of the Party Committee of the Ministry of Foreign Affairs and Deputy Minister of Foreign Affairs. On the same month, he was first elected as a member of the National Assembly in 2016 from constituency no. 2 at Đắk Nông Province, with 140,073 votes. During this time, he held the following positions: Member of the Party Central Committee, Secretary of the Party Committee and Standing Deputy Minister of Foreign Affairs. 

In April 2020, he was re-appointed to the position of Deputy Minister of Foreign Affairs with period starting from 10 February 2020. This was the third time he has been appointed by the Prime Minister. On 30 January 2021, at the 13th National Congress of the Communist Party of Vietnam, he was elected as an official member of the Central Committee of the Communist Party of Vietnam for 13th term.

Minister of Foreign Affairs
On 8 April 2021, he was elected Minister of Foreign Affairs by the XIV National Assembly of Vietnam at the proposal of Prime Minister Pham Minh Chinh.

On 6 July 2022, he met with Russian Foreign Minister Sergey Lavrov in Hanoi. Lavrov called Vietnam a "key partner" of Russia in ASEAN.

Personal life
Bui is married and has a son.

Awards and honors
:
 Labor Order (2011)
Certificate of Merit from the Ministry of Foreign Affairs (2005)
Certificate of Merit from the Prime Minister, twice (2009, 2011)
:
 Isala Order (2014)

See also
List of foreign ministers in 2022
List of current foreign ministers

References

External links 
 Ministry of Foreign Affairs of Vietnam

1962 births
Living people
People from Hanoi
Government ministers of Vietnam
Foreign ministers of Vietnam
Members of the National Assembly (Vietnam)
Columbia University alumni
Members of the 12th Central Committee of the Communist Party of Vietnam
Members of the 13th Central Committee of the Communist Party of Vietnam